Joseph-Félix Bouchor (15 September 1853 – 27 October 1937) was a French painter noted for his portraits and his Orientalist themes.

Biography
The artist was born in Paris. He studied at the Beaux-Arts. Joseph-Felix Bouchor exhibited his works at the Salon des Artistes Francais in 1878. During World War I, he was embedded with the allied troop and realized many military paintings depicting French and American infantry, cavalry and air forces in action on the frontline. He is famous for his portraits of General John Pershing (1860–1948), French President Georges Clemenceau and his illustrations of the American Expeditionary Force during World War I.

After the war, Joseph-Felix Bouchor travelled to North Africa and painted orientalist topics. His works belong to many public collections, including the Orsay Museum in Paris, the Museums of Beaux-Arts in Marseille, Angers, Vannes and Nantes, France. Many artworks belong to the collection of the musée national de la coopération Franco-américaine in Blérancourt, France.

Joseph-Félix Bouchor died in Paris in 1937.

Gallery

See also
 List of Orientalist artists
 Orientalism

Notes

Sources and References
 Benezit Dictionary of Artists
 Franco-Americain Museum in Blérancourt, France

1853 births
1937 deaths
19th-century French painters
19th-century French male artists
20th-century French painters
20th-century French male artists
French war artists
École des Beaux-Arts alumni
French male painters
Orientalist painters